Clerc is a French surname. Notable people with the surname include:

 Albert Clerc, French chess player
 Aurélien Clerc, Swiss cyclist
 François Clerc, French footballer
 José Luis Clerc, Argentine tennis player
 Julien Clerc, French singer
 Laurent Clerc, teacher, co-founder of the first school for the deaf in North America
 Maurice Clerc (mathematician), French mathematician
 Maurice Clerc (organist), French organist
 Mialitiana Clerc (born 2001), Malagasy alpine skier
 Onésime Clerc, Swiss born Russian naturalist
 Vincent Clerc, French rugby union player

See also 
 LeClerc (surname)
 Leclercq (surname)
 Clerck (surname)
 De Clerck (surname)

French-language surnames